"Winter Wonderland" is a pop standard written in 1934.

Winter Wonderland may also refer to:

Winter Wonderland (film), a 1946 American film
Winter Wonderland (Emilie-Claire Barlow album)
Winter Wonderland (MU330 album)
Winter Wonderland (Point of Grace album)
Winter Wonderland (Paul Carrack album)
"Winter Wonderland" (Shinee song), a 2016 single by South Korean boy group Shinee
Winter Wonderland (game), a piece of interactive fiction by Laura A. Knauth
Hyde Park Winter Wonderland, an annual festival held in Hyde Park, London
XFM Winter Wonderland, annual music festival held by radio station XFM London

See also